A widow's man was a fictitious seaman kept on the books of Royal Navy ships during the 18th and early 19th centuries so that their pay and rations could be redistributed to the families of dead crew members. This financial arrangement helped keep widows from being left destitute following the death of their seafaring husbands.

Practice
The number of widows' men on a ship was proportional to the ship's size. A first-rate might have as many as eighteen, while a sixth-rate might have only three. The ratio was reduced by Admiralty order on 25 October 1790.

The existence of widows' men served as an incentive for men to join the Royal Navy, rather than the Merchant Navy, as they knew that their wives would be provided for if they died.

Historical research
This procedure can lead to some confusion to modern students of history. For example, the sloop  carried 153 men on its voyage exploring Puget Sound, but the widow's man brings its official complement to 154.
Reportedly, in 1738 the sloop Wolf discharged its widow's man when the company was reduced, but whether this was an accident or an attempt to maintain crew strength is difficult to determine.

References 

Accounting systems
Legal fictions
History of the Royal Navy
Widowhood in the United Kingdom